José Felipe Rivero y Lemoine (April 30, 1797 – September 8, 1873) was a Spanish politician, governor, minister and military leader who participated in the Battle of Ayacucho and held important public positions in Spain. He was the last Viceroy of Navarra and the penultimate Governor of the Captaincy General of Santo Domingo.

Biography
He was born in the city of La Plata into a family belonging to the Upper-Peruvian nobility. He was the son of the doctor of laws Juan Francisco Rivera Vieyra, a native of Buenos Aires, and Bárbara Lemoine de Villavicencio, a native of Chuquisaca and daughter of the maestre de campo Juan Bautista de Lemoine. His father served as subdelegate governor and was also a lieutenant colonel of the militias. In 1810, due to the separatist insurrections, his family emigrated to the province of Puno. He entered, together with his siblings, the Ejército Real del Perú, and in 1812 he was admitted as a cadet in the battalion Ligero del Centro, an infantry corps in which he would carry out his entire military career in Peru and in which in 1824 he would reach the rank of commander and chief of the same in replacement of the Colonel Baldomero Espartero whom the viceroy had sent on commission to Spain. At the command of this body he fought with distinction in the Battle of Ayacucho.

After the royalist defeat and the loss of Peru, he headed to the Iberian Peninsula in the company of his former chief Espartero. He remained in the peninsula until 1828 when he returned to active service. In 1831 he was promoted to colonel and during the First Carlist War he was promoted to lieutenant general.

First Carlist War 
In November 1836 he signed orders as Secretario de Estado y del Despacho de la Guerra (Secretary of State and of the War Office).

In 1838 he had been appointed General Commander of the Royal Infantry Guard, and then successively Captain General of the eighth District, of Aragon, of Old Castile and Andalusia, being also elected senator. In 1862 he was appointed Governor and Captain General of the Province of Santo Domingo, which had recently rejoined Spain. He was in office until the following year. Upon his return to the peninsula, he served as President of the Supreme Court of War and Navy, and President of the Supreme Council of War, a position that he would hold until his death on September 8, 1873. He was decorated with the great crosses of Isabel la Católica, Carlos III, San Fernando and San Hermenegildo. 4

His brother José Claudio, also a former royalist officer but who chose to remain in the new Republic of Bolivia, married the only daughter of the absolutist General Pedro Antonio Olañeta, with whom he had numerous children.

References

Viceroys of Navarre
Spanish generals
Military personnel of the First Carlist War
1797 births
1873 deaths